Jan Tęczyński may refer to:
 Jan Tęczyński (1581–1637), voivode of Kraków (1620–1637), Cup-Bearer of the Crown in 1618
 Jan Tęczyński (died 1405), member of the Tęczyński family, starost and castellan of Kraków
 Jan Tęczyński (died 1470), member of the Tęczyński family, castellan of Kraków, voivode of Kraków and Lublin
 Jan Tęczyński (1485–1553), Chamberlain and voivode of Sandomierz, Castellan and governor of Lublin, Speaker of the court of the Crown, Castellan of Wojnicki, and Count of the Holy Roman Empire